Clean Harbors, Inc.  is an American provider of environmental and industrial services, including hazardous waste disposal for companies, including Fortune 500 companies, small waste generators and federal, state, provincial and local governments.

The company has expanded through organic growth and acquisitions to approximately 400 service locations in North America including over 50 hazardous waste management facilities in 38 U.S. states, seven Canadian provinces, Mexico and Puerto Rico.

The company is included in the S&P 400 mid-cap index and the S&P 1500 composite index.

History 

Clean Harbors, Inc. was founded in 1980 in Brockton, Massachusetts,  a Boston suburb, by Alan S. McKim, who continues as the company's CEO and Chairman. The company had one truck and four employees who transported and disposed of hazardous wastes for local businesses. It soon began adding larger corporate accounts and grew to 18 employees and $1.5 million in revenues by the end of its second year. In year three its revenue increased to $4.2 million and 34 employees.

Clean Harbors expanded to offer emergency hazardous waste cleaning services and industrial waste disposal, as well as ongoing management of hazardous material sites. Revenues continued to climb approaching $50 million in 1986.

Expansion and diversification
Clean Harbors held its initial public offering (IPO) offering of one million shares at $9 a share on the NASDAQ on November 24, 1987. Six months later Clean Harbors' stock had risen from $9 to more than $15. The company made a secondary offering at the higher share price. After the two tranches Alan McKim retained about 60 percent ownership of Clean Harbors.
Going public set the stage for expansion. Clean Harbors, still solely an environmental services company, purchased Occupational Safety and Health Administration (OSHA) Resource Conservation and Recovery Act (RCRA) certified hazardous waste incinerators in Arkansas, Nebraska, Ontario, Quebec, Texas and Utah, which it continues to own and operate to this day.

During this time Clean Harbors also developed its emergency response capabilities. Its first project came in 1984 when it removed oil from a tanker, which foundered off Cape Cod in a snowstorm. It participated in several cleanup projects in New England and expanded to respond to emergencies outside of the region as well as handling industrial and land-based cleanup and transportation projects.

During this time the company also greatly expanded its services for the industrial and chemical industry sectors. These services focused on collecting, packing and disposing of industrial and research laboratory and production chemicals, many of which were disposed of through Clean Harbors' expanding network of RCRA-certified landfills and incinerators. In 1998, Clean Harbors Industrial Services was established as division to handle in-plant cleaning and maintenance services, including chemical cleaning, vacuuming, steam cleaning and hydroblasting of chemical processing equipment.

Over the years Clean Harbors has continued to expand through organic growth and approximately 35 acquisitions. Most of the acquisitions were relatively small compared to Clean Harbors’ overall revenues. Major acquisitions, such as Eveready, Inc., Peak Energy Services, Teris LLC and most notably, Safety-Kleen Systems, their best acquisition to date, have substantially added to the company's assets and broadened its service lines to include industrial and energy services, solvent recovery/recycling, lodging and oilfield and environmental dewatering technologies.
Today, Clean Harbors has a substantial presence in oil and gas oilfields and refinery operations and used oil recycling and re-refining while maintaining and growing its environmental and industrial services business lines.

Acquisitions timetable
Over the years Clean Harbors has completed the purchase of more than 35 companies or substantial divisions of companies. Early investments from Clean Harbors’ founding until 2009 were primarily in the environmental services, waste management and industrial services areas. It made its first major acquisition in the oil and gas area in 2009 and has since further expanded in that sector through organic growth and acquisitions.

Significant acquisitions include:

1989 – Chem Clear Inc. (Aqueous waste treatment with facilities in Baltimore, Chicago and Cleveland) First major acquisition outside of New England.
1995 – Kimball Incinerator Facility (Waste incinerator facility from Ecova Corp.) First RCRA-certified incinerator.
2002 – Chemical Services Division of Safety-Kleen (55 service centers and 33 waste management facilities) Significantly expanded Clean Harbors' chemical and waste disposal services.
2007 – Teris LLC (Incinerator and treatment, storage and disposal facilities) Extended Clean Harbors’ reach to California.
2008 – Safety-Kleen Solvent Recycling Division and Universal Environmental (Solvent recycling facilities in Chicago and Hebron, Ohio) Gave Clean Harbors a significant position in solvent recycling.
2009 – Eveready Inc. (Industrial maintenance and production, lodging and seismic services primarily for the oil and gas industry) significantly expanded energy and industrial services and provided a major presence in Canada.
2011 – Peak Energy Services (Oil and gas surface rentals for liquid, solid and sludge processing) Added new capabilities to Clean Harbors oilfield services.
2012 – Safety-Kleen (Used oil recycling and re-refining, and parts washers) The $1.25 billion purchase added small generator market resources and significantly expanded the company.
2021 - HydroChemPSC (a leading U.S. provider of industrial cleaning, specialty maintenance and utilities services).

Finance
On May 20, 2003, Clean Harbors revised previously announced treatment of the non-cash cumulative effect of adopting SFAS No. 143 from a $34 million non-cash tax effected gain, to a reduction of the purchased value assigned to the CSD assets of $46.5 million.

On March 15, 2005. Clean Harbors, Inc. announced to restate financial statements for the years 2003 and 2002, and financial information for the years 2001, 2000, and 1999, to correct errors relating to the methodology it had established for estimating self-insured workers' compensation and motor vehicle liability claims.

Industries served 
Chemical/Specialty Chemical, Pharmaceutical/Biotechnology, Refinery/Petrochemical, Utilities, Retail, Engineering/Consulting, Health Care, Education, Manufacturing, Transportation, Steel & Primary Metals, Government.

See also 
 List of cleaning companies
 List of S&P 400 companies

References 

American companies established in 1980
1980 establishments in Massachusetts
Companies listed on the New York Stock Exchange
Companies based in Plymouth County, Massachusetts
Norwell, Massachusetts
Business services companies established in 1980
Multinational companies headquartered in the United States
Cleaning companies of the United States
1980s initial public offerings